is a JR West Geibi station located in Ōya, Saijō-chō, Shōbara, Hiroshima Prefecture, Japan.

Hibayama Station features one side platform. The Saijō River is located about 100m behind the station.

History
1987-04-01: Japan National Railways is privatized, and Hibayama Station becomes a JR West station

Around the station

Japan National Route 183
Hiroshima Prefectural Route 254 (Hibayama Kōen Route)

Connecting lines
All lines are JR West lines.
Geibi Line
Bingo-Ochiai Station — Hibayama Station — Bingo-Saijō Station

External links
 JR West

Geibi Line
Railway stations in Hiroshima Prefecture
Shōbara, Hiroshima